Robert Köstenberger (born 15 January 1957) is an Austrian judoka. He competed at the 1980 Summer Olympics and the 1984 Summer Olympics.

Between 1986 and 1988 Köstinger fought in the Staatsliga A for ASKÖ Reichraming. After that he went back to JC Manner.

References

External links
 

1957 births
Living people
Austrian male judoka
Olympic judoka of Austria
Judoka at the 1980 Summer Olympics
Judoka at the 1984 Summer Olympics
Sportspeople from Linz
20th-century Austrian people
21st-century Austrian people